The West African lungfish (Protopterus annectens), also known as the Tana lungfish or simply African lungfish, is a species of African lungfish. It is found in a wide range of freshwater habitats in West and Middle Africa, as well as the northern half of Southern Africa.

Description

Protopterus annectens has a prominent snout and small eyes. Its body is long and eel-like, about 9–15 times the length of the head. It has two pairs of long, filamentous fins. The pectoral fins have a basal fringe and are about three times the head length, while its pelvic fins are about twice the head length. In general, three external gills are inserted posterior to the gill slits and above the pectoral fins.

It has cycloid scales embedded in the skin. About 40–50 scales occur between the operculum and the anus, and 36–40 around the body before the origin of the dorsal fin. It has 34–37 pairs of ribs. The dorsal side is olive or brown in color and the ventral side is lighter, with great blackish or brownish spots on the body and fins except on its belly.

Distribution 
The West African lungfish is distributed throughout Africa. It has two subspecies; P. a. annectens is found primarily in the basins of Sahel as well as Guinea and Sierra Leone whilst the other subspecies, P. a. brieni is known largely from the upper Congo River area and from the Zambezi of Mozambique.

Habitat 
Like other African lungfish, the West African lungfish is an obligate air breather and a freshwater-dwelling fish. It is demersal, meaning that it lives primarily buried within riverbeds. Due to the dry season frequently drying the rivers and floodplains in which it lives, the West African lungfish can aestivate for up to a year; however the West African lungfish generally only aestivates between wet seasons.

Diet 
The Tana lungfish has a diet not unlike other lungfish, consisting of various mollusks, crabs, prawn, and small fish within its distribution. It can also go for up to 3 1/2 years without any food intake whatsoever. During this time period it behaves much like an aestivating fish in that it buries itself in the mud and does not move until more favorable conditions occur.

References

External links
 Photos at Primitivefishes.com

West African lungfish
Freshwater fish of West Africa
Least concern biota of Africa
West African lungfish